Anderson Airport may refer to:

 Anderson Regional Airport in Anderson, South Carolina, US (FAA/IATA: AND)
 Anderson Municipal Airport in Anderson, Indiana, US (FAA/IATA: AID)
 Sigurd Anderson Airport in Webster, South Dakota, US (FAA: 1D7)

See also 
Anderson Field (disambiguation)